Headington Quarry is a residential district of Oxford, England, located east of Headington and west of Risinghurst, just inside the Oxford ring road in the east of the city. To the south is Wood Farm. Today the district is also known colloquially as "Quarry". The area, now residential, is considerably uneven due to previous quarrying in the area.

The Church of England parish church of the Holy Trinity was designed by George Gilbert Scott and built in 1848–49. The east window of its chancel was designed by Ninian Comper. The Friends of Holy Trinity Church was founded in 2002 to raise funds and look after the church.
In 1930, C. S. Lewis, Oxford academic and author of The Chronicles of Narnia, and his brother Warnie moved, with Janie Moore and her daughter Maureen, into "The Kilns", a house on the outskirts of Headington Quarry. Lewis attended Holy Trinity Church. He first preached there on 29 March 1942, on the subject of "Religion and pleasure", and he is buried in the churchyard.

There is a former Methodist Chapel in Quarry High Street.
The Headington Quarry Morris Dancers are based in the area. Headington Quarry Morris Dancers were the first Morris dancers ever seen by Cecil Sharp, on Boxing Day 1899. This chance meeting was one of the events that sparked a lifelong interest in folk dance, song and music, to which Sharp devoted much of his life.

Headington Quarry was designated a conservation area in 1971, and the Friends of Quarry is a residents' association which aims to preserve the distinctive character of the Conservation Area and its immediate neighbourhood.

Other features
Geographically central to the Quarry, the original school, variously named Headington Quarry National School, Headington Quarry Church of England Junior Mixed School, and Headington Quarry Church of England First School, was closed in 2003 due to a lack of enrolments. The school building was originally built in 1864.  The school is now home to the Headington Quarry Foundation Stage School.  The school building is conservation listed.

Headington Quarry is noted for its array of narrow, winding roads and alleyways; for the undulating terrain on which houses have been built as a result of the quarrying that took place; and for the significant amount of greenspace in the area.

The wartime Bletchley Park cryptoanalyst Joan Clarke (1917–1996), colleague and briefly fiancée of Alan Turing, lived at 7 Larksfield in Headington Quarry, from 1991 until her death. On 27 July 2019, a blue plaque was unveiled at her former home to commemorate her.

Headington stone

Headington Quarry had a number of stone quarries. Headington stone, a style of limestone, was traditionally used for some Oxford University college buildings, although it was prone to erosion by pollution. In 1396, stone from Headington was used to build the bell-tower for New College. Headington stone was also used for the foundations and walls of All Souls College in the first half of the fifteenth century, and then in the 1520s by Cardinal Wolsey to build his Cardinal College (now Christ Church).

References

Sources

Areas of Oxford
Quarries in England
History of Oxford